Dean School was listed on the National Register of Historic Places in 2019.

It is a one-room schoolhouse.

In 2014, Montana still had about 60 one-room schoolhouses in use.

References

External links

One-room schoolhouses in Montana
School buildings on the National Register of Historic Places in Montana
National Register of Historic Places in Stillwater County, Montana